Konda is a kecamatan in South Konawe, Southeast Sulawesi, Indonesia. Konda is located 55 kilometres north of Andoolo, the capital of South Konawe Regency and 15 kilometres from Kendari. Its capital is located in kelurahan Konda.

References

Districts of Southeast Sulawesi